{{Infobox person
| image = Richard "Levelord" Gray at Geek Picnic 2017 in St Petersburg.jpg 
|name          = Richard Gray
|other_names   = Levelord
|caption       =
|birth_date    = 
|birth_place   = New Haven, Connecticut, United States
|known_for     = Level design in Duke Nukem 3D, Quake, Heavy Metal FAKK 2and SiN video games
|employer      = Levelord Games
|occupation    = Level designer
|website       = www.levelord.com
}}

Richard Gray (also known as Levelord) is a video game designer who is best known for designing levels for 3D video games. His most famous works are perhaps the levels for Duke Nukem 3D and SiN. During development of the expansion for Duke Nukem 3D, he quit his position at 3D Realms to co-found the company that became Ritual Entertainment.

He is known for hiding difficult to find Easter eggs in his levels in the form of hidden messages. Some of these can only be found by viewing the level in an editor program or cheating in the game, with a message such as "You're not supposed to be here! - Levelord". Duke Nukem 3D is known for having many such messages written on walls in some levels. His chosen pseudonym dates back to his early work on what became Blood starting in September 1994, based on how he signed off e-mails to designer Nick Newhard. His transfer to the Duke Nukem 3D team in March 1995 was one of the causes of the strain that lead to Blood being published by GT Interactive over 3D Realms.

He created the first suspended platform, aka "void", deathmatch called HIPDM1 or "The Edge of Oblivion" for the Quake add-on pack Scourge of Armagon.  This "islands in space" design of this multiplayer map became a staple in Quake III Arena and many other deathmatch games. He created the first player-the-size-of-a-rat deathmatch level with the release of SPRY or "Behind Zee Bookcase" for SiN.

With MumboJumbo's acquisition of Ritual and its transition from big-budget projects (like SiN Episodes) to casual gaming, he has been involved with smaller, more quickly developed and more experimental games.

He has released a hidden object game called Becky Brogan - The Mystery of Meane Manor, using the game programming language BlitzMax.

References

External links
 
 
 
 Mumbo Jumbo
 Interview from Gamasutra''
 
 BlitzMax Post

1957 births
American video game designers
Living people
Artists from New Haven, Connecticut